The  is a Japanese railway line connecting Kiryū Station in Kiryū, Gunma and Matō Station in Nikkō, Tochigi. This is the only railway line that the third-sector company  operates. The company acquired the line from the East Japan Railway Company (JR East) in 1989. As the name suggests, the line runs along the Watarase River through a deep valley.

History
The Ashio Railway Co. opened the line to Ashio-Motoyama (2 km beyond Mato) in 1911/12 to service the Ashio Copper Mine, and leased the line to JNR in 1913. Passenger services were introduced in 1914, and the line was nationalised in 1918.

The copper mine closed in 1973, the same year the line was deviated for the construction of the Kusaki Dam, including the 5242m Kusaki Tunnel.

In 1989 the Ashio-Motoyama - Mato section was closed and the operation of the balance of the line was transferred to the Watarase Keikoku Railway Co.

Basic data
Distance: 44.1 km
Gauge: 1,067 mm
Stations: 17
Double-tracking: None
Electrification: None
Railway signalling:
Kiryū — Shimo-Shinden: Automatic
Shimo-Shinden — Matō: Simplified Automatic

Station list
Trains stop at stations marked "●" and pass those marked "｜".
Local trains stop at all stations (other than Shimo-Shinden Signal Box).

References
This article incorporates material from the corresponding article in the Japanese Wikipedia.

External links 
 Watarase Keikoku Railway official website 

Railway lines in Japan
Rail transport in Gunma Prefecture
Rail transport in Tochigi Prefecture
1067 mm gauge railways in Japan
Japanese third-sector railway lines